Americans in Taiwan are residents of Taiwan who are from the United States. 4,742 Americans citizens were living in Taiwan, as of 2020.

References

United States